Loki's wager is the unreasonable insistence that a concept cannot be defined, and therefore cannot be discussed.

According to the Prose Edda ( ch. 35), the Norse god Loki once made a bet with the dwarf Brok, and wagered his head. He lost, and in due time the dwarves came to collect. Loki had no problem with giving up his head, but insisted they had absolutely no right to take any part of his neck. Everyone concerned discussed the matter; certain parts were obviously head, and certain parts were obviously neck, but neither side could agree exactly where one ended and the other began. Loki kept his head indefinitely, although his lips were stitched shut as punishment for getting out of the bet with tricky wordplay.

See also
 Sorites paradox
 DraupnirThe gold ring at the center of the myth
 Equivocation
 Fuzzy concept
 Merchant of Venicespecifically how the 'pound of flesh' agreement was nullified
 Moving the goalposts
 Quibble (plot device)The use of the fallacy as a plot device
 Vagueness

References

Verbal fallacies
Arguments
Loki